Jane Clifton (born 10 April 1949) is a Gibraltar-born Australian actress, singer, writer and voice artist. 
 
She is best known for her role in TV serial Prisoner as tough prison bookie Margo Gaffney.

As a singer, she had a stint with Jo Jo Zep and has recorded an album featuring Jenny Morris and Wendy Matthews, Mark Williams and Marc Hunter

Biography

Family and citizenship 
Clifton was born in Gibraltar to British Army parents. In 1961 she emigrated to Perth, Australia, before later settling in Melbourne. She became a naturalised citizen of Australia in 1992.

Radio and voice-over career 
Clifton started out her career on Melbourne community radio stations 3CR and 3RMT-FM in the 1970s. She then worked for commercial stations 3AK, Radio National and 774 ABC. Clifton has also done voice-over work for commercials and audio books.

Film, television and stage
Clifton has acted extensively in film and the stage and in various television programs. Beginning in cult favorites Stork (1971) and Pure S (1975), her films include The Clinic and A Slice of Life. Her stage roles include The Pack of Women and Mum's the Word. She has also made a number of television appearances, starting in the mid 70s with the Crawford's series Division 4, Homicide and Bluey, Against the Wind, Skyways, Holiday Island, Sweet and Sour, Carson's Law and Shock Jock, but her best-known acting role is probably that of tough prison bookie Margo Gaffney in Prisoner. Clifton played the role for 107 episodes from 1980 until 1984 on an intermittent basis as the script allowed, having previously appeared in the minor role of Yvonne, from episode 9, and even appeared in the Prisoner in Concert special.

Clifton also performed with Betty Bobbitt and Colette Mann as part of a three-woman troupe, The Mini Busettes, in the 1980s in RSLs across Australia.

In September 2010, it was announced that Clifton would be joining the cast of Neighbours as Judge Willow. Her scenes aired in November of that year.

In 2015 she appeared in the television series The Doctor Blake Mysteries as Sister Josephine.

Music
Clifton is also a singer. In the late 1970s she was a member of new wave band Stiletto which had a number of releases on the Oz label.

Discography

Studio albums

Soundtracks

Singles

Awards and nominations

Countdown Australian Music Awards
Countdown was an Australian pop music TV series on national broadcaster ABC-TV from 1974 to 1987, it presented music awards from 1979 to 1987, initially in conjunction with magazine TV Week. The TV Week / Countdown Awards were a combination of popular-voted and peer-voted awards.

|-
| 1984
| herself – "Girl on a Wall"
| Best Female Performance in a Video
| 
|-

Author
Clifton is the author of the novels Half Past Dead and A Hand in the Bush.

Filmography

FILM

TELEVISION

References

External links
 
 

1949 births
Australian film actresses
Australian soap opera actresses
Australian women novelists
Living people
Gibraltarian emigrants to Australia
Singers from Melbourne
Naturalised citizens of Australia
20th-century Australian actresses
20th-century Australian women singers
21st-century Australian actresses
21st-century Australian novelists
21st-century Australian women singers
21st-century Australian women writers
Jo Jo Zep & The Falcons members